Corfield is a town and locality in the Shire of Winton in north-western Queensland, Australia.

Geography
The Landsborough Highway also passes through the locality (but not through the town) merging with the Kennedy Developmental Road just before crossing into Winton. The Central Western railway line passes through the south of the locality to its terminus at Winton railway station.
The Richmond–Winton Road follows a section of the north-western boundary. 

The principal land use is cattle grazing.

As the boundaries of Winton hug the grid layout of its streets, a number of Winton's facilities are actually located in Corfield. These include the Winton Golf Course and the Winton Showground and Racecourse.

History
Jirandali (also known as Yirandali, Warungu, Yirandhali) is an Australian Aboriginal language of North-West Queensland, particularly the Hughenden area. The language region includes the local government area of the Shire of Flinders, including Dutton River, Flinders River, Mount Sturgeon, Caledonia, Richmond, Corfield, Winton, Torrens, Tower Hill, Landsborough Creek, Lammermoor Station, Hughenden, and Tangorin.

In its earlier incarnation as a Cobb & Co changing station along the Hughenden to Winton mail route, the locality was named Manuka—after a nearby sheep station.

The population of the town peaked at around thirty to forty residents and facilities included "five railway houses, plus the station master’s house, a post office, two petrol depots, a hotel and a school and teacher’s house ... a goods shed and railway building."

Corfield Post Office opened on 5 October 1898 and closed in 1991.

Corfield State School opened on 4 February 1957 and closed on 31 January 1975. It reopened on 27 January 1976 but closed again on 15 December 1989.

Facilities
Corfield has since declined and now has a permanent village population of seven. The Corfield Pub is the main community facility in the village.

The nearest primary and secondary schools are in Winton.

Events 
The major social event in Corfield is the Corfield Cup horse race run in early August—a pun on the better known Caulfield Cup horse race run in Melbourne.

References

External links

 Town map of Corfield, 1976

Towns in Queensland
Shire of Winton
Localities in Queensland